Bloody September (Indonesian: September Berdarah) was an incident on 26 September 2019 during the height of 2019 Indonesian protests and riots in Kendari, Southeast Sulawesi. Two students, Imawan Randi and Yusuf Kardawi, from Haluoleo University was allegedly shot by the police when protesting in front off the provincial parliament building and the regional police headquarter against the controversial revision on Corruption Eradication Commission and the new Criminal Code Bill. 

The shooting was commemorated by the students of the university every year since then with demands to investigate and prosecute the preparator. On 2022, the commemoration's demonstration ended with a riot and clash with security personnels. Both cases investigation as of 2022 has not yet been solved.

References 

2019 protests
Protests in Indonesia
Riots and civil disorder in Indonesia
September 2019 events in Indonesia
Student protests in Indonesia